Elysius melanoplaga is a moth of the family Erebidae first described by George Hampson in 1901. It is found in Ecuador and Bolivia.

Subspecies
Elysius melanoplaga melanoplaga (Ecuador)
Elysius melanoplaga amarua Seitz, 1922 (Bolivia)

References

Moths described in 1901
melanoplaga
Moths of South America